Arthur Mumford Smith (September 19, 1903 – November 20, 1968) was an associate judge of the United States Court of Customs and Patent Appeals.

Education and career

Born on September 19, 1903, in Scott, Indiana, Smith received an Artium Baccalaureus degree in 1924 from the University of Michigan and a Bachelor of Laws in 1926 from the University of Michigan Law School. He entered private practice in Chicago, Illinois from 1926 to 1929, Detroit, Michigan from 1929 to 1946, and Dearborn, Michigan from 1946 to 1959. He was a lecturer in patent law at the University of Michigan Law School from 1951 to 1959.

Federal judicial service

Smith was nominated by President Dwight D. Eisenhower on March 25, 1959, to an Associate Judge seat on the United States Court of Customs and Patent Appeals vacated by Judge Eugene Worley. He was confirmed by the United States Senate on April 29, 1959, and received his commission on April 30, 1959. His service terminated on November 20, 1968, due to his death in Washington, D.C.

Publication

In 1957 he authored  the frequently cited "Pitfalls in Patent Prosecution" subsequently published in the Journal of the Patent Office Society, volume 41, pgs 5-33 (1959).

References

External links
 

1903 births
1968 deaths
20th-century American lawyers
Judges of the United States Court of Customs and Patent Appeals
Michigan lawyers
United States federal judges appointed by Dwight D. Eisenhower
20th-century American judges
University of Michigan Law School alumni
University of Michigan Law School faculty